Ansar Ahmad is an Indian politician from Allahabad, Uttar Pradesh. He has been Minister of state for Livestock under Mulayam Singh Yadav led Government of Uttar Pradesh from 2003 to 2007. He has been twice Member of the Legislative Assembly from Phaphamau in Prayagraj. He won Assembly elections of 2002 and 2012 Uttar Pradesh Vidhan Sabha Elections. He is member of Samajwadi Party.

References

Year of birth missing (living people)
Living people
Uttar Pradesh politicians
People from Varanasi district
Apna Dal politicians
Samajwadi Party politicians
Place of birth missing (living people)